"Dem Bones" (also called "Dry Bones" and "Dem Dry Bones") is a spiritual song. The melody was composed by author and songwriter James Weldon Johnson (1871–1938) and his brother, J. Rosamond Johnson. It was first recorded by The Famous Myers Jubilee Singers in 1928. Both a long and a shortened version of the song are widely known. The lyrics are inspired by Ezekiel 37:1–14, where the prophet Ezekiel visits the Valley of Dry Bones and prophesies that they will one day be resurrected at God's command, picturing the realization of the New Jerusalem.

The song

The chorus and verses are noted for many variations among performers, but fall into the following style. The second verse reverses the first in a pattern similar to:
 The neck bone (dis)connected from the head bone
 ... etc...

Artists

Fred Waring and his Pennsylvanians recorded the song on 30 April 1947 and released it on the 78 rpm record Decca 23948. The Delta Rhythm Boys recorded it in 1950 under the name "Dry Bones".

A recording of the song by the Canadian vocal group The Four Lads was featured prominently in "Fall Out", the final episode of the 1967–68 science fiction series, The Prisoner. The song is also performed at several points in the episode, most notably when the character of Number 48 spontaneously begins to lip sync to the recording in order to disrupt a ceremony involving the show's protagonist, Number 6. Later, several characters are shown dancing to the same recording.

Fred Gwynne performs a solo version, accompanying himself on guitar, in a 1965 episode of the Munsters: "Will Success Spoil Herman Munster?".

Alvin and the Chipmunks covered the song for the end credits of their 1999 direct-to-video film Alvin and the Chipmunks Meet Frankenstein.

See also
 Ezekiel Saw the Wheel
 Christian child's prayer § Spirituals
 Drinkin' Bone, country song whose lyrics allude to “Dem Bones”

References

Book of Ezekiel
American children's songs
African-American spiritual songs